The Claremont Showground near Perth, Western Australia is home to the annual Perth Royal Show. In 1902,  of land were reserved in the Perth suburb of Claremont for a new showground to replace the Guildford Showgrounds. The Royal Agricultural Show, of three days, was first held there in October and November 1905.

History
In 1929 a pavilion and other features were built for the Western Australia Centenary.

The Claremont Showground is serviced by a special events railway station on the Fremantle line. Opened on 20 September 1995, it has direct connection with the showgrounds. The original Showgrounds Station, opened in 1954, was located  further east with platforms on either side of the line, and required negotiating road crossings to access the showgrounds.

Bruce Campbell Arena
The Bruce Campbell Arena, an enclosed grass field forms the focal point of events at the Showgrounds.

Speedway

From 1927 until 2000, the  Claremont Speedway operated on a track around the edge of the arena. Its size made it the largest speedway in weekly operation in a state capital in Australia.

With the closure of Claremont, speedway in Perth moved to the  Perth Motorplex Speedway in Kwinana Beach.

Australian rules football
The arena has been the past been used for Australian rules football matches. In the West Australian Football League (WAFL), Perth won its first premiership against East Fremantle there in 1907. They were the original home of Claremont-Cottesloe Football Club in its first year in the WAFL before moving to Claremont Oval in 1927. On 19 March 2005, the venue was used to host a one-off WAFL match between Claremont and West Perth, with Claremont winning in front of 7,812 spectators. Due to redevelopment of Claremont Oval, Claremont used the Showgrounds as its home ground between 2014 and 2016.

References

Further reading
Cooper,William., Moore, Garrick and Michael White.(2004) Adversity and achievement : a history of the Royal Agricultural Society of Western Australia Claremont, W.A.: The Society.

External links
Royal Agricultural Society of WA

Landmarks in Perth, Western Australia
Culture in Perth, Western Australia
West Australian Football League grounds
Defunct speedway venues in Australia
Claremont Football Club
Event venues established in 1902
Showgrounds in Australia